The United States Dressage Federation, or the USDF, is the national membership federation for the equestrian sport of dressage. Running under the USEF, the Federation is committed to education, recognition of achievement and promotion of dressage in the United States. 

Founded in 1973, the USDF now has over 33,000 members. It offers year-end awards for  every level of competition, as well as different breeds, junior and young riders, and adult amateur riders.

The USDF also has an instructor certification program, and offers many clinics for riders of all levels.

External links
United States Dressage Federation

Dressage
Dressage
Equestrian organizations
Equestrian sports in the United States
Equestrian organizations headquartered in Kentucky